The Lathrop Library is one of several libraries at Stanford University in California. It is the current undergraduate library and houses the East Asia Library. Part of the Stanford University Libraries system, it opened on September 15, 2014 and houses collections and services formerly located in J. Henry Meyer Memorial Library, which was demolished in 2015. The library is located in a renovated building formerly occupied by the Stanford Graduate School of Business.

Namesake
Lathrop Library is named for Jane Lathrop Stanford, co-founder of Stanford University with her husband, Leland Stanford.

References



External links 
 Stanford University Libraries
 Lathrop Library

Library buildings completed in 2014
Lathrop Library
Lathrop Library
2014 establishments in California